Single Swing (also called single-time swing) is a fast dance rhythm in the larger swing family of dances.  

Swing or Jive is danced to popular rock-and-roll or jitterbug music that has 4 beats per measure and a tempo of 35 - 46 measures per minute.  Most figures are written to span a measure and a half of music with a rock, recover, and two triples at the slower tempos: eight steps over six beats of music.  When the tempo gets faster, it becomes more difficult to fit those triples in, and "single swing" is more comfortable.  Each 6-count figure becomes, rock, recover, step, step, or slow, slow, quick, quick: four steps over the six beats of music. Swing bounces a little on soft knees and dances mostly in place on the dance floor.

Swing dances